Winterlicious is the eleventh studio album by American singer-songwriter Debbie Gibson, released on October 21, 2022, independently by her own label StarGirl Records.

Overview 
Winterlicious is Gibson's first Christmas album, featuring a mix of original songs and covers of popular Christmas carols. The lead single is "Christmas Star", which was released on November 12, 2021. The album includes the song "Heartbreak Holiday", which marks Gibson's second duet with New Kids on the Block member Joey McIntyre after "Lost in Your Eyes, the Duet".

"Sleigh Ride" was originally recorded by Gibson on the 1992 various artists album A Very Special Christmas 2. Her rendition of "White Christmas" is a duet with her father Joe. "Cheers!" is an original New Year's Eve song Gibson wrote in memory of her late mother and former manager Diane.

To promote the album, Gibson will host the Winterlicious holiday tour across the US starting on November 25, 2022.

Track listing

Charts

References

External links
 
 
 

2022 Christmas albums
Debbie Gibson albums
Christmas albums by American artists
Self-released albums